Margaret Rachel Scott (5 April 1874 – 27 January 1938) was a dominant player in early women's golf, who won the first three British Ladies Amateurs in 1893, 1894, and 1895.

Scott was a daughter of John Scott, 3rd Earl of Eldon, and the fourth of seven children. Several of her brothers were also golfers; Michael Scott won The Amateur Championship in 1933 towards the end of a long career, Osmund Scott was the runner-up in the same tournament in 1905, and Denys Scott also played.

In her first two championship wins, Lady Margaret Scott beat Issette Pearson, the founder and first Secretary of the Ladies' Golf Union.  She won by 7 & 5 in 1893 and 3 & 2 in 1894, then beat Emma Lythgoe 5 & 4 in 1895.  Thereafter, Scott retired from competitive golf.

She married the Hon. Frederick Gustavus Hamilton-Russell in 1897, and died in 1938 at the age of 63.

References

External links
 

English female golfers
Amateur golfers
Winners of ladies' major amateur golf championships
1874 births
1938 deaths
Daughters of British earls
Scott family (England)